Jász-Nagykun-Szolnok is the name of an administrative county (comitatus or vármegye) in Hungary. It lies in central Hungary and shares borders with the Hungarian counties Pest, Heves, Borsod-Abaúj-Zemplén, Hajdú-Bihar, Békés, Csongrád, and Bács-Kiskun. The rivers Tisza and Körös flow through the county. The capital of Jász-Nagykun-Szolnok county is Szolnok. Its area is 5582 km². The county is named after the Ossetians (Jasz) and Cumans (Kun) who settled there, along with Szolnok. The county was part of the Danube–Criș–Mureș–Tisa Euroregion between 1997 and 2004.

Geography
This county has a total area of  – 6,00% of Hungary.

Neighbouring counties 
 Heves and Borsod-Abaúj-Zemplén County in the North.
 Hajdú-Bihar and Békés County in the East.
 Csongrád County in the South.
 Bács-Kiskun and Pest County in the West.

Symbols

Coat of arms and flag
The county's coat of arms was recreated in 1991 from the coats of arms of the former Jászkun periphery, with the crown and frame decoration on it. It consists of the unification of the coat of arms of Jászság, Nagykunság and former Exterior-Szolnok County. The upper part is divided into two equally spaced vertices from top to bottom.

The flag is vertically divided into two equal sections (blue and white), with the coat of arms on it, and the county's name embroidered with gold thread under the coat of arms. Its ratio is 2:1. The use of both coat of arms and flag is regulated by the county council.

History

Demographics

In 2015, it had a population of 379,897 and the population density was 68/km².

Ethnicity
Besides the Hungarian majority, the main minorities are the Roma (approx. 19,000), German and Romanian (500).

Total population (2011 census): 386,594
Ethnic groups (2011 census):
Identified themselves: 344,488 persons:
Hungarians: 323,293 (93.85%)
Roma: 18,935 (5.50%)
Others and indefinable: 2,260 (0.66%)
Approx. 56,000 persons in Jász-Nagykun-Szolnok County did not declare their ethnic group at the 2011 census.

Religion

Religious adherence in the county according to 2011 census:

Catholic – 124,331 (Roman Catholic – 123,208; Greek Catholic – 1,106);
Reformed – 42,968; 
Evangelical – 1,127; 
other religions – 4,312; 
Non-religious – 108,247; 
Atheism – 4,651;
Undeclared – 100,958.

Regional structure

Transport

Road network 

Highway network
 from Budapest to Nagykereki (Romanian border). (planned)
 from Szolnok to Szentgotthárd (Austrian border). (planned)
 from Kecskemét to Gyula (Romanian border). (under construction)

Road network
  runs from Budapest to Záhony (Ukrainian border), via Szolnok, Törökszentmiklós and Karcag. - 
 runs from Budapest to Füzesabony, via Jászberény and Jászapáti.
 runs from Szolnok to Hatvan, via Újszász, Jászberény and Jászfényszaru. ~ 
 runs from Füzesabony to Debrecen, via Tiszafüred.
 runs from Tiszafüred to Fegyvernek, via Kunhegyes. ~ 
 old sections of Main road 4.
 runs from Kecskemét to Gyula (Romanian border), via Kunszentmárton and Öcsöd. - 
 runs from Kunszentmárton to Hódmezővásárhely. - 
 runs from Törökszentmiklós to Mezőberény, via Mezőtúr. - 
402 runs from Szolnok-center to Main road 4.
 runs from Szolnok to Kunszentmárton, via Martfű. -

Rail network 

Rail lines in the county cover  of route. 35% are double track, and over 45% are electrified.

Politics

County Assembly

The county is governed by the County board of supervisors, which is located in the county seat.
The Jász-Nagykun-Szolnok County Council, elected at the 2019 local government elections, is made up of 18 counselors, with the following party composition:

Presidents of the County Assembly

Members of the National Assembly
The following members elected of the National Assembly during the 2022 parliamentary election:

Municipalities 
Jász-Nagykun-Szolnok County has 1 urban county, 21 towns, 4 large villages and 52 villages.

City with county rights
(ordered by population, as of 2011 census)
  Szolnok (72,953) – county seat

Towns

 Jászberény (27,087)
 Törökszentmiklós (21,071)
 Karcag (20,632)
 Mezőtúr (17,510)
 Kisújszállás (11,397)
 Tiszafüred (11,382)
 Tiszaföldvár (11,129)
 Jászapáti (8,889)
 Túrkeve (8,878)
 Kunszentmárton (8,714)
 Jászárokszállás (7,929)
 Kunhegyes (7,704)
 Martfű (6,535)
 Fegyvernek (6,507)
 Újszász (6,321)
 Jászfényszaru (5,680)
 Jászkisér (5,467)
 Rákóczifalva (5,434)
 Kenderes (4,809)
 Abádszalók (4,180)
 Besenyszög (3,339)

Large villages

Cibakháza
Jászladány
Kunmadaras
Öcsöd

Villages

Alattyán
Berekfürdő
Csataszög
Csépa
Cserkeszőlő
Fegyvernek
Hunyadfalva
Jánoshida
Jászágó
Jászalsószentgyörgy
Jászboldogháza
Jászdózsa
Jászfelsőszentgyörgy
Jászivány
Jászjákóhalma
Jászszentandrás
Jásztelek
Kengyel
Kétpó
Kőtelek
Kuncsorba
Mesterszállás
Mezőhék
Nagyiván
Nagykörű
Nagyrév
Örményes
Pusztamonostor
Rákócziújfalu
Szajol
Szászberek
Szelevény
Tiszabő
Tiszabura
Tiszaderzs
Tiszagyenda
Tiszaigar
Tiszainoka
Tiszajenő
Tiszakürt
Tiszaörs
Tiszapüspöki
Tiszaroff
Tiszasas
Tiszasüly
Tiszaszentimre
Tiszaszőlős
Tiszatenyő
Tiszavárkony
Tomajmonostora
Tószeg
Vezseny
Zagyvarékas

Gallery

Notable people
Many famous people have been born or lived in present-day Jász-Nagykun-Szolnok County:

 Statesman: Miklós Horthy
 Politicians: János Tóth, István Antal, Sándor Fazekas, Mihály Varga
 Writers, poets and playwrights: Ferenc Verseghy, István Csukás
 Musicians Classical: Déryné Róza Széppataki, Zoltán Jeney, Zoltán Mága. Other: Pál Kalmár, Ferenc Molnár "Caramel"
 Scientists: Gábor Szegő, Kalman Laki, Albert Kónya, József Hámori, Avram Hershko
 Sportspeople: Aladár Gerevich, Bertalan Papp, Gábor Benedek, Tibor Csík, Pál B. Nagy, Géza Csapó
 Actors, entertainers and film directors: Alexander Korda, Zoltan Korda, Vincent Korda, János Görbe, Gyula Szabó, Eszter Tamási
 Militarian: Lajos Czinege
 Businessman: Sándor Csányi
 Others: Gyula Németh, István Sándor

International relations 

Jász-Nagykun-Szolnok County has a partnership relationship with:

See also
Cumans - the ancient nomadic warriors after whom the county is named

References

External links
 Official site in Hungarian, English, German and French
 Új-Néplap (szoljon.hu) - The county portal
Hungary at GeoHive

 
Counties of Hungary